Reid–White–Philbin House, also known as Evergreen House, is a historic home located at Lexington, Virginia.  It was built in 1821, and is a two-story, Federal style brick dwelling. It features an early entry porch supported by Ionic order columns A two-story brick addition was made to the left-hand gable end in 1847. The addition has a two-tier front portico and a post-bellum conservatory with bay window.  Attached to the rear is a -story stone kitchen wing dated to the second half of the 18th century.  Also on the property is a contributing early- to mid-19th century dependency.  It was built for locally prominent businessman, educator, and politician Samuel McDowell Reid.

It was listed on the National Register of Historic Places in 2000.  It is located in the Lexington Historic District.

References

External links
Reid–White House, 208 West Nelson Street, Lexington, Lexington, VA: 5 photos, 8 measured drawings, and 1 photo caption page at Historic American Buildings Survey

Historic American Buildings Survey in Virginia
Houses on the National Register of Historic Places in Virginia
Federal architecture in Virginia
Houses completed in 1821
Houses in Lexington, Virginia
National Register of Historic Places in Lexington, Virginia
Individually listed contributing properties to historic districts on the National Register in Virginia